Boys Over Flowers is a 2009 South Korean television series starring Koo Hye-sun, Lee Min-ho, Kim Hyun-joong, Kim Bum, Kim Joon, and Kim So-eun. Based on the Japanese manga series  written and illustrated by Yoko Kamio. The series tells a story of a working-class girl who gets tangled up in the lives of a group of wealthy young men in her elite high school. It aired for 25 episodes on KBS2 from January 5 to March 31, 2009.

It is often regarded as a pioneer in Korean high school series, as well as to have helped the proliferation of the "Korean Wave". The series earned high viewership ratings in South Korea, and became a cultural phenomenon throughout Asia. Lee Min-ho's role as the leader of F4 completely contrasted his role in Mackerel Run, which earned him overseas popularity.

Synopsis
Shinhwa Group is one of South Korea's largest conglomerates and is headed by the strict and arrogant Chairwoman Kang Hee-soo (Lee Hye-young). Her son Gu Jun-pyo (Lee Min-ho), heir to the Shinwha Group, leads the F4, the most popular and powerful group of boys at the prestigious Shinhwa High School, an ultra-elite school exclusive to the richest families in Korea. Yoon Ji-hu (Kim Hyun-Joong), So Yi-jung (Kim Bum), and Song Woo-bin (Kim Joon) —Jun-pyo's best friends and rich heirs in their own right—make up the remaining members of the group. When F4 bullies a boy to the verge of suicide, the poor but vivacious Geum Jan-di (Ku Hye-sun) saves his life. A photo of Jan-di's heroics appears in the newspapers, resulting in media backlash from consumers against the Shinwha Group. Chairwoman Kang arranges for the commoner Jan-di to receive a scholarship to attend the high school to appease the outraged consumers. Jan-di's family runs a dry cleaning business, and she lives in a small home with her parents, Geum Il-bong (Ahn Suk-hwan) and Na Gong-joo (Im Ye-jin), and her younger brother Geum Kang-san (Park Ji-bin).

Immediately, Jan-di dislikes her wealthy classmates and is disgusted by their obsession with the F4 boys. Irked by her strong-headed nature, Jun-pyo singles out Jan-di to bully, but she refuses to cower and stands up to him, even kicking him in the face. She is the first person to stand up to him and dislike him, which begins to intrigue him. Bored and lonely, he starts to play silly tricks on her and eventually begins to fall for her. Jun-pyo continues to encourage the students, led by a mean group of girls, to bully and torture Jan-di. She gets attacked with eggs and flour by the bullies. F4 member, Ji-hu gives her his handkerchief to help clean her up, showing his compassionate side. He saves her from being attacked by a group of boys after school. As a result of his kind actions, Jan-di starts to develop feelings for Ji-hu but soon discovers that Ji-hu fosters a one-sided love for Min Seo-hyun, a successful celebrity, model and lawyer-in-training and his childhood friend. The bullying continues as Jun-pyo drags Jan-di to a school dance. The mean girls trick Jan-di into thinking the event is a costume party, so she wears a Wonder Woman outfit. They cause her to fall into the food table, covering her in wet food. Ji-hu and Seo-hyun rescue her from the humiliation, and Seo-hyun gives her a makeover. The belle of the ball, she dances with Ji-hu, making Jun-pyo jealous.

Seo-hyun befriends Jan-di and leaves for Paris to pursue her own career. Seeing how unhappy Ji-hu is, Jan-di convinces him to follow Seo-hyun. After Ji-hu leaves the country to pursue a relationship with Seo-hyun, Jan-di begins to grudgingly spend more time with Jun-pyo. He bullies her into a date, which she initially planned on skipping. Out of guilt for making Jun-pyo wait for her many hours in the snow, she agrees to spend time sightseeing and getting coffee with him, but they end up getting locked in the skylift overnight. Jun-pyo writes a message on the wall commemorating his "first night" with Jan-di, which she sees later and thinks is sweet. Later, Jun-pyo declares to the school that she is his girlfriend. By this time, he has grown on Jan-di. Although she thinks he can be overbearing, she realizes that he is actually sweet and acts out because of his lonely childhood.

Shortly afterward, Jan-di's only friend at school, Oh Min-ji, takes her to a club. She has been secretly obsessed with Jun-pyo and was upset that he declared feelings for Jan-di. At the club, Min-ji takes pictures of Jan-di lying unconscious in bed with a guy. When the photos are leaked to the media, Jun-pyo is outraged and believes that Jan-di has been cheating on him. His fans and crowd of adoring classmates once again bully and abuse Jan-di. The rest of the F4 help Jan-di identify the source of the drama. Min-ji reveals her involvement with the photos to Jun-pyo. It is revealed that she and Jun-pyo have been classmates since kindergarten and that Min-ji has long been trying to win his attention by undergoing cosmetic surgery. Jun-pyo shuns Min-ji for betraying her friend and rushes to save Jan-di, who is still being attacked by bullies. He apologizes for doubting her, and their bond grows stronger. Even after being so horrible to her, Jan-di stands up for Min-ji, and Jandi, does not forgive Min-Ji of her evil plan. Min-Ji leaves the school permanently. 

Ji-hoo returns to Korea, causing Jan-di to feel confused about her feelings. While Jun-pyo relentlessly tries to shower her with affection, she is increasingly distracted by Ji-hoo. During a weekend trip on a private island, they spend time together. She has an accident swimming and Ji-hoo rescues her because Jun-pyo cannot swim because of an horrible incident that took place when he was a child. This upsets Jun-pyo. Later, when she has trouble sleeping, Jan-di takes a walk on the beach, where she sees a sad Ji-Hoo. She comforts him about his past love for Seo-hyun, but he surprises her by declaring his feelings for Jan-di. Jun-pyo stumbles upon Jan-Di and Ji-Hoo as they kiss. Jun-pyo  expresses how hurt he is from the kiss. In a rage, punching Ji-hoo in anger and feel betrayed by both, Jan-Di and Ji-Hoo. . The next morning, Jun-Pyo  leaves the island and becomes reclusive, causing Jan-di to feel guilty. She realizes that she has feelings for Jun-pyo. Her best friend Chu Ga-eul bonds with F4 member So Yi-jung, and she develops a crush on him. Jun-pyo wants to have Jan-di expelled from school, and his sister suggests a contest of three sports to determine who gets their way. If Jun-pyo wins, Jan-di is expelled. The first event is horseracing, which Jun-pyo wins but at the expense of his horse which he rides too hard and carelessly. The second event is car racing, which Ji-hoo wins despite childhood trauma of car accidents. The third event is swimming, the childhood trauma of Jun-pyo. Yi-jung offers to swim for Jun-pyo and Jan-di wants to race for herself. Jan-di wins in a close race. Eventually, while Ji-hoo loves Jan-di, he let's her go because he cares for his friend Jun-pyo and knows that Jan-di will help him become a better man.

When Jun-pyo's mother, Chairwoman Kang, learns of Jun-pyo's relationship with Jan-di, she attempts to humiliate Jan-di and her family due to their social status. Jan-di perseveres and finds a friend in a male model, who helps her earn money by modeling for a magazine. The photos are suspiciously sexy, angering Jun-pyo as he feels hurt by Jan-di seeking help from someone else, especially a gorgeous man. Jan-di is kidnapped by the model, who reveals that he is the younger brother of the student whose suicide Jan-di had prevented, and he seeks revenge. The model tries to kiss Jan-di while she is unconscious. Jun-pyo arrives alone to rescue Jan-di, but the model has him beat up in front of a tied-up Jan-di. The model tries to force Jun-pyo to promise never to see Jan-di, a request he refuses. Jun-pyo is beaten to within an inch of his life. In a rage, the model attacks him with a chair, but Jan-di throws herself in the way so the chair hits her instead. The pair are rescued by the F4 members. The injury that Jan-di sustained from the incident prevents her from swimming in the future.

After Jun-pyo's father falls ill, his mother forces him to begin training to lead the Shinhwa Group. He leaves the city, turns cold toward his friends and Jan-di, and begins to accompany his mother to formal events. After six months, Jan-di and F4 pursue him and try to convince him to break free; however he turns them away. Plotting to keep the distance between her son and Jan-di, Chairwoman Kang arranges Jun-pyo's engagement to the heiress Ha Jae-kyung. Jan-di approaches Jun-hee, Jun-pyo's loving older sister, for finding work, and she becomes Jun-pyo's personal maid. It is evident that both Jun-pyo and Jan-di still love each other. Even though Jae-kyung falls in love with Jun-pyo and tries to win him over, she soon realizes that her efforts are in vain, and during their wedding, she refuses to marry Jun-pyo. Jae-kyung states that she will feel guilty that she was standing in the way of a relationship that was meant to be.

Jan-di and Jun-pyo reunite only for Jan-di to leave the city due to her friends being threatened by his mother. Jun-pyo is heartbroken and gets into trouble with the police. Later that week, he gets into a car accident while trying to save Ji-hu's life. Jun-pyo tells Ji-hu to take care of Jan-di, knowing that Ji-hu loves Jan-di too. Jun-pyo survives the accident but loses his memories, including those of Jan-di. Encouraged by her mother to pursue her heart, Jan-di returns to Jun-pyo but is saddened that he cannot recall who she is. After asking him to try to remember her name, she falls into a pool as he watches, causing him to be flooded by memories of them saving each other from drowning. He calls out her name and rescues her and they unite once again. Although he asks her to marry him, they decide it is best to pursue their individual dreams first. Jun-pyo leaves for America, where he furthers the Shinhwa Group and becomes a successful businessman.

Four years later, Ji-hu graduates medical school and still has feelings for Jan-di. Jan-di is a third-year medical student, while Yi-jung is a successful architect and returns from Sweden for Ga-eul, who has become a teacher who teaches pottery to kids. Jun-pyo arrives in a helicopter and proposes to Jan-di at the beach side; the rest of the F4 arrive at the same time and they all walk alongside the beach, smiling happily.

Cast

Main

Supporting

Extended
 Park Ji-bin as Geum Kang-san (금강산), Jan-di's younger brother
 Kim Ki-bang as Bom Choon-sik (봄춘식), Jan-di and Ga-eul's boss
  as Jeong Sang-rok (정상록), Jun-pyo's mother's secretary
 Song Suk-ho as Butler Lee, Jun-pyo's family's butler
 Kim Young-ok as Jun-pyo's family's head maid
 Seo Min-ji as Jang Yu-mi (장유미) 
 Lee Jung-gil as Yoon Seok-young (윤석영), Ji-hu's grandfather
 Lim Ju-hwan as So Il-hyun (소일현), Yi-jung's older brother
 Park Soo-jin as Cha Eun-jae (차은재), Yi-jung's first love
  as Choi Jin-hee (최진희) (aka Ginger)
 Jang Ja-yeon as Park Sun-ja (박선자) (aka Sunny)
 Min Young-won as Lee Mi-sook (이미숙) (aka Miranda)
 Jung Eui-chul as Lee Min-ha (이민하) / Lee Jae-ha (이재하). He also falls for Geum Jan-di for her behaviour. 
 Jung Chan-woo as young Gu Jun-pyo
 Kang Han-byeol as child Gu Jun-pyo
 Kang San as young Yoon Ji-hu
 Nam Da-reum as child Yoon Ji-hu
 Moon Bin as young So Yi-jung
 Jung Tae-ho as child So Yi-jung
 Kang Yu-seok as young Song Woo-bin
 Lee Eun-soo as child Song Woo-bin
 Lim Si-eun as young Min Seo-hyun
 Kim Young-sun as Fishing village resident 3 (cameo)
Source: HanCinema

Original soundtrack

Reception
Elle Magazine ranked Boys Over Flowers #6 (out of 10) on the October 2020 10 Best K-Dramas To Binge-Watch On Netflix list. Boys Over Flowers attracted high viewership ratings and buzz throughout South Korea during its broadcast in 2009. The cast members became household names and shot to stardom overnight, and after the series ended, several of them became the faces of various endorsements and advertisements. The show is credited with launching the career of its lead actor, Lee Min-ho, who had previously appeared in a small number of low-budget high school dramas.

During its broadcast, the series influenced South Korean men to take their appearances more seriously to copy the metrosexual or "pretty boy image" (kkotminam, lit. "men as beautiful as flowers") of the F4 characters in the drama. This led to an increase in South Korean males wearing cosmetics, preppy and cruise outfits, and clothing in traditionally more feminine styles like the color pink and floral prints. The drama's local filming locations became tourist attractions, such as the Damyang Dynasty Country Club in South Jeolla Province; Ragung Hanok Hotel in Silla Millennium Park in Gyeongju, North Gyeongsang Province; Hilton Namhae Gold & Spa Resort in South Gyeongsang Province; Grand Hyatt Seoul ice rink; Lotte Hotel World's Emerald Room; Farmer's Table in Heyri; and Yangpyeong English Village. The overseas locations featured such as New Caledonia and Macau also became sought-after holiday destinations.

The series' international popularity extended to Japan, Thailand, Vietnam, Singapore, India, Nepal, Malaysia, Taiwan, Sri Lanka, and Zambia among others. The cast members held various sold-out events across Asia, such as concerts and fan meetings. The Seoul chapter of the Young Women's Christian Association (YWCA) criticized the series for being the epitome of materialism and the Cinderella complex, saying it sets a bad example for Korean dramas by depicting school violence, and teenagers indulging in pleasure and prejudice toward others based on their appearance and social class. The YWCA report also singled out the leading female character (Geum Jan-di) for being passive and dependent.

Ratings
In this table,  represent the lowest ratings and  represent the highest ratings.

Awards and nominations

References

External links
  
 
 

Boys Over Flowers
Korean Broadcasting System television dramas
2009 South Korean television series debuts
2009 South Korean television series endings
South Korean television dramas based on manga
Korean-language television shows
South Korean romantic comedy television series
South Korean teen dramas
South Korean television series based on Japanese television series
Television series about teenagers
South Korean high school television series
Television series about bullying